Saint Dominic is a c.1565 painting of Saint Dominic by Titian, now in the Galleria Borghese in Rome.

References 

Religious paintings by Titian
1565 paintings
Paintings in the Borghese Collection
Paintings of Saint Dominic